Ciotina River may refer to:

Ciotina River (Bistrița)
Ciotina, a tributary of the Bancu in Suceava County

See also 
Ciotorogu River